An election to Roscommon County Council took place on 23 May 2014 as part of that year's Irish local elections. 18 councillors were elected from three electoral divisions by PR-STV voting for a five-year term of office, a reduction in 8 seats from the previous election in 2009. Boyle Town Council was also abolished.

Fine Gael imploded in the county, losing 7 seats including those of a number of long serving councillors; due to voter anger over continuous boil water notices and the closure of Roscommon Hospital’s Accident and Emergency Department; the latter leading to a split in the party locally. Fianna Fáil and Independents performed well in the election with the former becoming the largest party in Roscommon for the first time since 1985.

Results by party

Results by Electoral Area

Athlone

Boyle

Roscommon

References

Post-Election Changes
† Boyle Fianna Fáil Councillor Eugene Murphy was elected as a TD for Roscommon–Galway at the Irish general election 2016. His brother, Joe, was co-opted to fill the vacancy on 14 March 2016. 
†† Boyle Fine Gel Councillor Maura Hopkins was elected to Seanad Eireann in April 2016. Liam Callaghan was co-opted to fill the vacancy in July 2016.
††† Athlone Fianna Fáil Councillor Paddy Kilduff resigned from the party and became an Independent on 9 February 2018 citing disillusionment with how the party was run and how its members were treated.
†††† Athlone Fianna Fáil Councillor Ivan Connaughton resigned from the party and became an Independent on 3 January 2019.

External links
 Official website

2014 Irish local elections
2014